Javier Pereira Collado (born 5 November 1981) is a Spanish actor. He won Goya Award for Best New Actor for his performance in Stockholm (2013) at the 28th Goya Awards.

Personal life 
From 2009 to 2011, Pereira was in a relationship with fellow actress Blanca Suárez.

Filmography

Films

 ¡Hasta aquí hemos llegado! (2002)
 Frío sol de invierno (2004)
 Heroína (2005)
 A golpes (2005)
 La bicicleta (2006)
 Tu vida en 65 minutos (2006)
 Días azules (2006)
 Aparecidos (2007)
 8 citas (2008)
 Animal de compañía (2008)
 Amigos... (2011)
 No tengas miedo (2011)
 Amanecidos (2011)
 Para Elisa (2013)
 Stockholm (2013)
 La sangre de Wendy (2014)
 Anochece en la India (2014)
 Que Dios nos perdone (2016)
 Asesinato en la Universidad (2018)

Short films

 Campeones (1997)
 El último día del principio de tu vida (2004)
 Busco (2006)
 Traumalogía (2007)
 Misericordiam Tuam (2008)
 El viaje al paraíso (2008)
 La vida que me queda (2010)
 Sexo explícito (2013)
 Objetos perdidos (2014)

Television series

 Señor alcalde (1998)
 Nada es para siempre (1999–2000)
 Policías, en el corazón de la calle (2000)
 Al salir de clase (2001–02)
 El comisario (2002)
 Hospital central (2004)
 El comisario (2005)
 Cuestión de sexo (2007–08)
 Revelados (2008)
 Aída (2009)
 Hospital central (2009)
 El Gordo: una historia verdadera (2010)
 Doctor Mateo (2010)
 La pecera de Eva (2011)
 14 de abril. La República (2011)
 Ángel o demonio (2011)
 Los misterios de Laura (2011)
 Gran hotel (2011)
 Frágiles (2012)
 Gran Reserva: El origen (2013)

Awards and nominations

References

External links 
 

1981 births
20th-century Spanish male actors
21st-century Spanish male actors
Goya Award winners
Living people
Male actors from Madrid
Spanish male film actors
Spanish male stage actors
Spanish male television actors